Fernie Castle is an enlarged sixteenth-century tower house in north-east Fife, Scotland.

Situated just east of the village of Letham, it was originally in an L-plan layout. The castle was later extended to include a three floor block which included a round tower at one of the corners.

The castle is now primarily used as a hotel which also caters to weddings.

References

Castles in Fife
Category B listed buildings in Fife
Listed castles in Scotland
Clan Balfour